Wovenhand (also stylized Woven Hand) is an American rock band from Denver, Colorado, United States, led by former 16 Horsepower frontman David Eugene Edwards.

Wovenhand's songs are known for their strong and unsettling Biblical references, influenced by Edwards' atypically dark approach to his  Christian faith.

History
The band began in 2001 as a solo project for Edwards while 16 Horsepower was taking a temporary hiatus.  Wovenhand's first live shows were performed by Edwards and multi-instrumentalist Daniel McMahon; the self-titled debut album was released in 2002 on Glitterhouse Records.  Performances following this record featured Edwards, McMahon, drummer Ordy Garrison and cellist Paul Fonfara.  2003 saw the release of Blush Music, the score to a dance performance mostly composed of reworked material from the first record.  Touring behind this album featured Shane Trost replacing Fonfara.

In 2004, Consider the Birds was released on the Sounds Familyre label, which has also released the previous Wovenhand releases domestically. Edwards performed the bulk of the instrumentation in the studio; he and Garrison toured behind the record as a two-piece.  16 Horsepower disbanded the following year, and Edwards further focused his attention on Wovenhand. Peter van Laerhoven, a Belgian guitarist, was added to the lineup, while McMahon and Trost became inactive with the group. 

After 2006's Mosaic, Pascal Humbert, a founding member of 16 Horsepower, became the band's bassist.  2008's Ten Stones was the first record from the group written and performed collaboratively – the project had thus evolved into a proper band, albeit with Edwards firmly at its head.  In 2009, the band operated as a three-piece, sans Van Laerhoven.  

Their fifth studio album, The Threshingfloor was released in June 2010. Shortly thereafter, the group announced touring plans opening for the progressive metal band Tool.

September 2012 saw the release of Wovenhand's sixth studio album, The Laughing Stalk, produced by Alexander Hacke (who along with Edwards is participating in the reunion of Australian post-punk band Crime And The City Solution). Wovenhand's lineup for the album was changed once again, as Humbert quit and new bassist Gregory Garcia Jr. along with second guitarist Chuck French were brought in. The resulting record was described as being "the most heavy incarnation that ever existed of Wovenhand".

Musical style 

Wovenhand began as a gothic country band but over time shifted to a more rock-oriented sound, which AllMusic classified as "gothic Americana rock". Wovenhand's music has incorporated elements of folk, country blues, gospel, rock and roll, rockabilly, surf, desert blues, progressive rock, post-punk and heavy metal. Cited influences on the band's music include Joy Division.

Discography

Studio albums

Other
 Blush Music (2003) [performance score]
 Blush (Original Score) (2003) [performance score]
 Puur (2006) [performance score]
 Black of the Ink (2011) [Book + 6-track EP re-recorded Best-of]
 Live at Roepaen (2012) [CD/2LP + DVD]

References

External links

Official Website
Official Facebook Page
Official MySpace Page
Woven Hand Live NPR Tiny Desk Concert Series

American folk rock groups
American hard rock musical groups
Gothic country groups
Indie rock musical groups from Colorado
Musical groups from Denver
Musical groups established in 2001
Deathwish Inc. artists
Glitterhouse Records artists